District 3 is an urban district of Ho Chi Minh City, the largest city in Vietnam. Together with District 1, District 3 is considered the bustling heart of the city, with a multitude of businesses, religious sites, historical buildings and tourist attractions.

History 
Established in December 1920, it was one of the first districts of Saigon.

Geography

This district has a total area of 5 km² and borders District 1, Phú Nhuận District, District 10 and Tân Bình District.

It is the location of Xá Lợi Pagoda, the largest in the city. The Vĩnh Nghiêm Pagoda is also located in District 3. There are many French-style villas in this district. Some notable offices are located in District 3 such as the Royal Thai Consulate (77 Trần Quốc Thảo).

Wards 
It is divided into 14 small subsets which are called wards (phường), numbered from Ward 1 to Ward 14.

Ward 1
Ward 2
Ward 3
Ward 4
Ward 5
Ward 6
Ward 7

Ward 8
Ward 9
Ward 10
Ward 11
Ward 12
Ward 13
Ward 14

Transportation

Streets 

Cư xá Đô Thành
Đường 2 Cư xá Đô Thành
Đường 3 Cư xá Đô Thành
Đường 4 Cư xá Đô thành
Đường 7 Cư xá Đô Thành
Bà Huyện Thanh Quan
Bàn Cờ
Cách Mạng Tháng 8
Cao Thắng
Cống Hộp
Điện Biên Phủ
Hai Bà Trưng
Hoàng Sa
Hồ Xuân Hương

Huỳnh Tịnh Của
Huỳnh Văn Bánh
Kỳ Đồng
Lê Ngô Cát
Lê Quý Đôn
Lê Văn Sỹ
Lý Chính Thắng
Lý Thái Tổ
Nam Kỳ Khởi Nghĩa
Ngô Thời Nhiệm
Nguyễn Đình Chiểu
Nguyễn Hiền
Nguyễn Phúc Nguyên
Nguyễn Sơn Hà

Nguyễn Thị Diệu
Nguyễn Thị Minh Khai
Nguyễn Thiện Thuật
Nguyễn Thông
Nguyễn Thượng Hiền
Nguyễn Văn Minh
Phạm Đình Toái
Phạm Ngọc Thạch
Pasteur
Rạch Bùng Binh
Sư Thiện Chiếu
Trần Cao Vân
Trần Huy Liệu
Trần Minh Quyền

Trần Quang Diệu
Trần Quốc Thảo
Trần Quốc Toản
Trần Văn Đang
Trương Định
Trương Quyền
Trường Sa
Tú Xương
Võ Thị Sáu
Võ Văn Tần
Vườn Chuối

Watercourse and bridges 

Part of the Nhiêu Lộc - Thị Nghè canal runs through the district. There are 8 bridges in District 3 crossing this canal:

 Bridge 6
 Bridge 7
 Bridge 8
 Trần Quang Diệu Bridge

 Bridge 9
 Lê Văn Sĩ Bridge
 Công Lý Bridge
 Kiệu Bridge

Railway 

District 3 hosts Saigon railway station, the largest and most important railway hub in the country. As the last stop on the North-South line, this station is connected to Bình Triệu railway station.

Demography 
As of 2010, the district had a population of 188,945.

Government 
The People's Committee's headquarters is located at No. 99, Trần Quốc Thảo street, Ward 7. Before  2015, it was located at No. 185 Cách Mạng Tháng 8 street.

The district also hosts the hall of the city's Party Committee at No. 111 Bà Huyện Thanh Quan street.

Education

Headquarters of the district's Division of Education and Training is located at No. 322 Nguyễn Thiện Thuật street.

In District 3, there are 5 high schools, including Nguyễn Thị Minh Khai High School and Marie Curie High School. It also hosts facilities of many universities like Pedagogical University, University of Economics, Open University and University of Architecture. British International School Vietnam's Tú Xương Primary campus is located in this district.

Tourism and attractions 
District 3 is listed by Time Out as one of 50 coolest neighbourhoods in the world.

References

External links

Districts of Ho Chi Minh City